MV Cape Lobos (T-AKR-5078), (former MV Laurentian Forest), was a Cape L-class roll-on/roll-off built in 1972.

Construction and commissioning 
The ship was built in 1972 by Port Weller Dry Docks, St. Catharines, Ontario. She was delivered to be used by Burnett Steamship Company as MV Laurentian Forest in November of the same year.

The ship was sold to Carlton Steamship Co. as MV Grand Encounter in 1985. She became the first vessel on scene during the recovery effort of Air India Flight 182 in June 1985. Grand Encounter carried 20 bodies from the wreck to Dublin.

In 1985, she was sold to Piute Energy & Transportation Co., Cleveland as MV Federal Seaway until 1986, as she would be again be sold to the Department of Transportation's Maritime Administration to be used in the Ready Reserve Force as MV Cape Lobos (T-AKR-5078) together with sister ship MV Cape Lambert (T-AKR-5077). She would be operated by the Military Sealift Command when activated. In September 1986, 200 M1A1 Abrams were transported by Cape Lobos to Germany from Toledo.

On 10 August 1990, together with her sister ship were activated to transport military equipments from Bayonne to Ad Dammam, Saudi Arabia during Operation Desert Storm and Desert Shield. She would once again be deactivated in 1992. A contract of $3.4 million for the G&M Welding & Fabrication Service, Galveston from the US Navy was made on 11 August 1992, for the repair of Cape Lambert and Cape Lobos. In 1994, Cape Lambert and Cape Lobos were put into the Wilmington Reserve Fleet, North Carolina. In February and March 1997, she made topside repairs at the Norfolk Shipbuilding and Dry Dock Corporation. Cape Lobos was lowered to the Ready Reserve Fleet in late September 1999.

During Operation Iraqi Freedom, Cape Lobos as re-activated from February until May 2003. From late November until December 2003, she had undergone drydocking at the Tampa Shipbuilding and Repair Company and returned to Wilmington Reserve Fleet once repairs were done. In May 2005 and 2006, she was towed to the North Carolina State Pier to participate in the National Maritime Day.

In July 2006, Cape Lambert would be transferred to the Ready Reserve Fleet status in August and Beaumont Reserve Fleet on 28 July 2006. Her fate would be decided in February 2009, when she was lowered to the emergency sealift status and on 30 September 2013, she began to be stripped of parts to began her disposal while in her non-retention status.

References

External links
 NavSource Online: MV Cape Lobos (AKR-5078)

Ships built in Ontario
1972 ships
Cargo ships of the United States Navy
Bremerton Reserve Fleet
James River Reserve Fleet
Wilmington Reserve Fleet
Merchant ships of the United States
Gulf War ships of the United States
Cold War auxiliary ships of the United States